Graham Hogg may refer to:

 Graham Hogg (rugby union, born 1948), Scottish rugby union international wing
 Graham Hogg (rugby union, born 1987), Scottish rugby union fly-half or centre and rugby sevens international, brother of Stuart Hogg